Mohammad Khairil Shahme bin Suhaimi (born 16 April 1993) is a Bruneian footballer who plays for Kasuka FC and the Brunei national football team as a defender or holding midfielder.

Club career
Khairil began his league football career with the Brunei Youth Team playing in the Brunei Premier League II. At the end of a year-long preparation for the 27th SEA Games, he joined IKLS FC for the 2014 Brunei Premier League season, scoring two goals from defence for the Kampong Ayer-based team. The following season, Khairil was placed in the newly-formed Tabuan Muda league team playing in the Brunei Super League in preparation for the next SEA Games which was to be held in Singapore. He scored his only goal for the Young Wasps against MS PDB on 22 November in a 5–1 victory.

Khairil moved to Indera SC in 2017 and shortly after was appointed club captain, replacing Afi Aminuddin who left for Kota Ranger FC. He managed to win the Brunei FA Cup later in the season, the first ever for Indera. He also gained continental club competition experience at the 2020 AFC Cup. He scored his first and solitary league goal for Indera in their opening fixture of the 2021 Brunei Super League season against BSRC FC on 20 June.

Khairil left Indera to join Kasuka FC for their 2022 Brunei FA Cup campaign. His team finished as runners-up to DPMM FC at the conclusion of the season.

International career

Youth international teams
As part of Tabuan Muda, Khairil travelled with the Brunei under-18s for a few Asian Schools Football Championship tournaments, including the one in 2010 where they were barred from participating by FIFA as soon as they landed in South Korea due to the ban imposed by football's governing body at the time. A period of centralised training for the 27th SEA Games commenced in March 2013, which Khairil took part in. Unfortunately, the Brunei under-23 squad which boasted the likes of Azwan Ali Rahman, Adi Said, Yura Indera Putera and Nur Ikhwan Othman failed to earn a single point in Myanmar the following December. In the third match against Singapore, Khairil was given his marching orders on the 65th minute for an off-the-ball incident, prematurely ending his involvement in the tournament.

Khairil's next international competition was with the under-21s at the 2014 Hassanal Bolkiah Trophy to be contested in August on home soil. He was ever-present in the group games, partnering Reduan Petara at centre-back. Brunei were eliminated by virtue of a single point in goal difference by Malaysia after both had accumulated 10 points.

The following year, Khairil was in the Brunei under-23 squad for both the 2016 AFC U-23 Championship qualification in March and the 28th SEA Games held in Singapore in May. He played three games for the AFC tournament in Indonesia, all ending in defeat. The team did not fare any better two months later, failing to score in five outings with Khairil playing in all of them.

Full international team
Khairil made his first international appearance for the full national team in a friendly against Cambodia in Phnom Penh which finished 6–1 to the hosts. A year later, he travelled to the same city for the 2016 AFF Championship qualification matches, facing the hosts as well as Laos and Timor-Leste. He was fielded only for the final game against Laos but only lasted the first half in a 4–3 loss on 21 October. The squad immediately turned their focus to the 2016 AFC Solidarity Cup in Kuching, Malaysia the next month. Khairil made another solitary appearance, this time in a 3–0 loss against Nepal on 8 November in the group stage.

Khairil was called up to the national team for the two-legged 2018 AFF Suzuki Cup qualifying matches against Timor-Leste in September. He played in both legs, partnering Hazwan Hamzah. The first leg which was played in Kuala Lumpur, Malaysia on 1 September finished 3–1 to Timor-Leste, which meant that a 1–0 home victory in the return leg at the Hassanal Bolkiah National Stadium was not enough for Brunei to qualify for the tournament.

Khairil joined the national team for the 2022 World Cup qualifying matches against Mongolia in a two-legged affair in June 2019. He ultimately did not take the field as Robbie Servais opted for the experience of Sairol Sahari instead.

In September 2022, Khairil was announced for a tri-nations friendly tournament involving the Maldives and Laos to commence in Bandar Seri Begawan. Under new head coach Mario Rivera, Khairil was converted into a holding midfielder and impressed in the second game against Laos which ended 1–0 to the Wasps. He kept his place in the lineup for the two-legged 2022 AFF Mitsubishi Electric Cup qualifying matches against Timor-Leste and played the full 180 minutes as Brunei managed to advance to the tournament proper with a 6–3 aggregate win. The next month, Khairil made three starts against Thailand, Indonesia and Cambodia in the tournament's group stage, all ending in defeat for the Wasps.

Honours
Indera SC
 Brunei FA Cup: 2017–18
 Sumbangsih Cup: 2018

References

External links

1993 births
Living people
Bruneian footballers
Brunei international footballers
Association football defenders
Indera SC players
Competitors at the 2013 Southeast Asian Games
Competitors at the 2015 Southeast Asian Games
Southeast Asian Games competitors for Brunei